Bernard Desmond Challenor (July 24, 1936 – March 15, 2000) was a public health professional and professor at the Mailman School of Public Health at Columbia University.

Education and career 
He completed his bachelor's degree at Hunter College and received his medical degree from the State University of New York-Downstate Medical Center in 1961. In addition, he earned a master of public health from Harvard University. Dr. Challenor worked at major public health entities throughout the 1960s, including the World Health Organization and the United States Public Health Service, serving in parts of Asia, Latin America, and West Africa. He was in the 1965 class of the United States Center for Disease Control and Prevention's elite Epidemic Intelligence Service. His international work included efforts to vaccinate for and eradicate smallpox. Following this, he worked for the Boston Department of Health and Hospitals.

Dr. Challenor led the partnership between Columbia University and Harlem Hospital Center, becoming deputy director of the Columbia University-Harlem Hospital Center Affiliation in 1969. As chairman elect and chairman of the Physicians Forum in the early 1970s, he advocated for the restructuring of the United States healthcare system and a national health insurance system. While at Columbia, he was the director of the general public health program and from 1978-1980, was acting dean of the Columbia Mailman School of Public Health. By 1985, he was an associate professor in the school and continued in his role as director of public health, partnering with the Columbia School of International and Public Affairs to offer a dual degree to students.

Death 
Dr. Challenor died of a heart attack in his Manhattan home.

Recognition 
The Columbia Mailman School of Public Health awards the "Bernard Challenor Spirit Prize" to students able to build community across departments in the school.

References

External links 

 Bernard Challenor publications indexed on PubMed.

American epidemiologists
World Health Organization
1936 births
2000 deaths
Columbia University Mailman School of Public Health faculty
SUNY Downstate College of Medicine alumni
Hunter College alumni
Harvard School of Public Health alumni
People from Manhattan